Méricourt is the name of several communes in France:

Méricourt, Pas-de-Calais
Méricourt, Yvelines
Méricourt-en-Vimeu, in the Somme département
Méricourt-l'Abbé, in the Somme département
Méricourt-sur-Somme, in the Somme département